Juan Carlos Navarro Feijoo, commonly known as either Juan Carlos Navarro or J. C. Navarro (born June 13, 1980), is a Spanish former professional basketball player. On March 14, 2014, he was named a EuroLeague Basketball Legend. He is the current team manager of FC Barcelona Bàsquet.

During his pro club career, Navarro was a two-time EuroLeague champion, in 2003 and 2010. He was also named the EuroLeague MVP in 2009, the EuroLeague Final Four MVP in 2010, and was selected as a member of the EuroLeague 2001–10 All-Decade Team. As the captain of the senior national team of Spain, Navarro notably won, among other medals, a FIBA World Cup gold medal in 2006, two Summer Olympics silver medals in 2008 and 2012, as well as two EuroBasket gold medals in 2009 and 2011. He also earned two All-EuroBasket Team selections (2005, 2011), and was the competition's MVP in 2011.

His nickname, La Bomba (The Bomb), is the name in Spanish for the tear drop, the type of shot he was a specialist in.

Early life
Juan Carlos Navarro Feijoo was born in Sant Feliu de Llobregat, Barcelona, Spain. Navarro began playing youth club basketball with a local club in Sant Feliu de Llobregat, called Club Bàsquet Santfeliuenc, at the age of 8. At the age of 12, he moved to the youth clubs of FC Barcelona.

Professional career

FC Barcelona (1997–2007) 
Navarro started playing with the senior men's club of FC Barcelona at the age of 17, making his Spanish ACB League debut on November 23, 1997. That year he was selected to attend the Nike Hoop Summit, but he opted stayed in Europe, and play for the Barcelona pro team. Due to his club obligations, he was also not on the Spanish junior national team that won the Albert Schweitzer Tournament, in Mannheim, in 1998.

With the acquisitions of Dejan Bodiroga and Gregor Fučka in 2003, FC Barcelona won all the competitions they played in that year. It was the first time the club won the EuroLeague championship. By winning the Spanish ACB League, the Spanish King's Cup, and the 2002–03 EuroLeague all in the same year, Barcelona won the coveted Triple Crown championship that year.

With Barcelona, Navarro played on Liga ACB (Spanish League) championship teams eight times: 1999, 2001, 2003, 2004, 2009, 2011, 2012 and 2014; the Spanish King's Cup winners seven times: 2001, 2003, 2007, 2010, 2011, 2013 and 2018; the Spanish Supercup winners five times: 2004, 2009, 2010, 2011 and 2015; the FIBA Korać Cup champions once: 1999; and the EuroLeague champions twice: 2003 and 2010. Navarro helped Barcelona reach the EuroLeague Final Four seven times: 2000, 2003, 2006, 2009, 2010, 2012, and 2014. Navarro was selected to the All-EuroLeague Team seven times: 2006, 2007, 2009, 2010, 2011, 2012 and 2013. In 2006, Juan Carlos Navarro earned the regular season Most Valuable Player award of the Spanish Liga ACB. He was named the Spanish Liga ACB Finals Most Valuable Player in 2009 and 2011. He was named the EuroLeague MVP in 2009, and the EuroLeague Final Four MVP in 2010.

Memphis Grizzlies (2007–2008) 
As a member of FC Barcelona, Navarro played with players like Sasha Đjorđjević, Artūras Karnišovas, Rony Seikaly, Pau Gasol, and Šarūnas Jasikevičius, which helped make him a better player, and he became one of the most promising young European players, early on in his career with Barcelona. Several NBA mock drafts started to set him as a projected NBA Draft pick.

In the 2001–02 season, Navarro was plagued by injuries, which dropped his NBA Draft stock. Eventually, the Washington Wizards drafted Navarro in the second round (with the 40th pick overall) of the 2002 NBA draft. Navarro subsequently declined the Wizards contract offer, as he preferred to stay with FC Barcelona.

On August 3, 2007, the Washington Wizards traded Navarro's draft rights, to the Memphis Grizzlies, in exchange for a future first-round draft pick. Navarro would later be reunited with his former FC Barcelona and Spain national teammate Pau Gasol, on the Grizzlies. After securing his €10 million contract buyout with FC Barcelona, Navarro signed a one-year contract with the Memphis Grizzlies of the NBA, and he played with them during the 2007–08 season.

In his rookie NBA season, Navarro was one of the Grizzlies' team leaders in three-point shooting (.361). He was also named to the 2007–08 NBA All-Rookie Second Team, after averaging 10.9 points per game. On June 18, 2008, Navarro decided to leave the NBA and return to Spain. He signed a four-year deal worth €12 million net income (with an optional fifth year that would bring the total contract to €15 million net income) with Barcelona, his former team. A qualifying contract offer, that had been previously tendered to Navarro by the Memphis Grizzlies, was eventually rescinded by the team on September 10, 2009. That allowed the Grizzlies the cap space to then sign Allen Iverson.

Navarro's final NBA game was played on April 16, 2008, in a 111 - 120 loss to the Denver Nuggets where he recorded 16 points, 7 assists, 4 rebounds and 2 steals.

Return to FC Barcelona (2008–2018) 

After spending the 2007–08 season in the NBA, with the Memphis Grizzlies, Navarro returned to FC Barcelona in the summer of 2008, on a 4-year €12 million net income contract. The contract included a €10 million buyout amount. The contract also included an optional fifth year, which brought the total contract to €15 million net income. In 2012, Barcelona picked up the fifth optional year of his contract (€3 million net income), and extended him for another two additional years, at a salary of €2.6 million per season after that, bringing the total to €8.2 million net income over three years.

Over the 2014–15 season, Navarro experienced several injury problems with his right leg. In late December 2014, it was announced that he would miss up to six weeks of action, due to a torn muscle in his right thigh. On June 29, 2015, it was announced by Barcelona that Navarro would miss three months of game action, due to plantar fasciitis on his right foot. Those injuries negatively impacted his performances over the season, in which he had averages of 10.5 points and 3.1 assists per game, on 37% shooting from the field overall, in 17 EuroLeague 2014–15 season games.

On August 17, 2018, Navarro retired from competing in active sports competition, and he joined the FC Barcelona club's head office structure. That fulfilled what had been previously established in the 10-year contract that he signed with the club in September 2017 - that he would join the club's front office, after he retired from playing basketball with the team.

At the time of his retirement from playing professional basketball, Navarro was the EuroLeague's all-time career leader in total Performance Index Rating (PIR) (that record was eventually broken by Vassilis Spanoulis), and also the league's career leader in total points scored (4,152 points) in the modern Euroleague Basketball era of the competition, since the year 2000 (that record was also eventually broken by Spanoulis). Navarro also retired as the all-time career leader in total points scored (4,321 points), in the entire history of the EuroLeague (since 1958), including when the competition was run by FIBA Europe, as he also scored 169 total points in the FIBA EuroLeague 1999–00 season. In March 2019, Navarro's number 11 jersey was retired by the club.

National team career
In the summer of 1998, Navarro was a member of the Spanish under-18 junior national team that won the gold medal at the 1998 FIBA Europe Under-18 Championship. He was also one of "The Golden Generation" boys of Spain (along with Felipe Reyes and future NBA players Pau Gasol and Raúl López) that defeated the United States' junior national team at the 1999 FIBA Under-19 World Cup.

Navarro played with the senior Spanish national team at the 2000 Sydney Summer Olympics. He also played at the 2001 EuroBasket, where he won two games during the tournament with buzzer-beaters. He scored 27 points during the bronze medal game against Germany. At the 2003 EuroBasket in Sweden, Navarro won a silver medal with the Spain's national team.

In Spain's seventh-place finish at the 2004 Athens Summer Olympics, he scored 18 points in Spain's loss against Team USA. At the 2005 EuroBasket, the Spanish national team, playing without Pau Gasol, finished in fourth place. Navarro was the second leading scorer of the tournament, with an average of 25.2 points per game, finishing behind only Dirk Nowitzki. In August 2006, he played on the Spanish national team that won the gold medal at the 2006 FIBA World Championship, after they defeated Greece in the tournament's final; after the Greeks had earlier defeated Team USA, in their semifinal, by a score of 101–95.

In September 2007, Navarro and Spain lost against Russia, in the gold medal game at the 2007 EuroBasket, which was held in Madrid, on Spain's home floor. Navarro was also a member of Spain's national team that won the silver medal at the 2008 Beijing Summer Olympics. Navarro scored 18 points in the gold medal game that Spain lost against Team USA.

As the defending champions, Spain retained their European crown at the 2011 EuroBasket. Navarro led his team with a game-high 27 points in the championship game over France. He earned All-Tournament Team accolades, along with his teammate, Pau Gasol, and he was named the EuroBasket MVP.

Navarro won a silver medal with Spain at the 2012 London Summer Olympics. He also played at the 2014 FIBA World Cup, at the 2016 Rio Summer Olympics, where he won a bronze medal, and at the 2017 EuroBasket, where he also won a bronze medal.

Post-playing career
After Navarro retired from playing professional basketball in August 2018, he began working in the front office of the Spanish Liga ACB club FC Barcelona. In April 2021, he was appointed by President Joan Laporta as Team Manager in replacement of Nacho Rodríguez.

Career statistics

EuroLeague

|-
! colspan="14" | FIBA EuroLeague 
|-
| style="text-align:left;" | 1997–98
| style="text-align:left;" | Barcelona
| 3 || 0 || 3.0 || .000 || .000 || .000 || .0 || 0.3 || 0.7 || .0 || 0.0 || 0.0
|-
! colspan="14" | Spent the 1998–99 season in the FIBA Korać Cup competition
|-
| style="text-align:left;"| 1999–00
| style="text-align:left;" | Barcelona
| 22 || 5 || 18.7 || .444 || .452 || .800 || 1.3 || 1.3 || 0.9 || .0 || 7.7 || 5.4
|- class="sortbottom"
| style="text-align:left;"| Career
| style="text-align:left;"|
| 25 || 5 || 16.8 || .440 || .452 || .800 || 1.2 || 1.2 || .9 || .0 || 6.8 || 4.7
|-
! colspan="14" | EuroLeague 
|-
| style="text-align:left;"| 2000–01
| style="text-align:left;" rowspan=7| Barcelona
| 12 || 8 || 27.8 || .465 || .388 || .682 || 2.8 || 2.7 || 1.1 || .0 || 12.7 || 12.2
|-
| style="text-align:left;"| 2001–02
| 17 || 2 || 19.0 || .433 || .333 || .816 || 1.5 || 1.9 || 1.0 || .0 || 10.4 || 10.3
|-
| style="text-align:left;background:#AFE6BA;"| 2002–03†
| 22 || 6 || 26.1 || .398 || .367 || .880 || 1.6 || 1.4 || .6 || .0 || 11.5 || 10.0
|-
| style="text-align:left;"| 2003–04
| 20 || 6 || 25.4 || .494 || .425 || .808 || 1.5 || 1.5 || 1.1 || .1 || 13.7 || 12.4
|-
| style="text-align:left;"| 2004–05
| 20 || 10 || 26.6 || .437 || .395 || .892 || 2.0 || 1.9 || 1.3 || .0 || 13.3 || 13.2
|-
| style="text-align:left;"| 2005–06
| 22 || 21 || 27.4 || .438 || .462 || .806 || 2.3 || 2.5 || 1.0 || .0 || 15.1 || 13.4
|-
| style="text-align:left;"| 2006–07
| 22 || 21 || 28.6 || .496 || .408 || .838 || 2.0 || 3.0 || .9 || .0 || 16.8 || 16.9
|-
! colspan="14" | Spent the 2007–08 season in the NBA with the Memphis Grizzlies 
|-
| style="text-align:left;"| 2008–09
| style="text-align:left;" rowspan=10| Barcelona
| 21 || 21 || 27.7 || .428 || .363 || .935 || 1.6 || 3.6 || 1.3 || .0 || 14.7 || 15.1
|-
| style="text-align:left;background:#AFE6BA;"| 2009–10†
| 21 || 21 || 25.4 || .430 || .348 || .857 || 1.4 || 3.1 || .9 || .0 || 14.1 || 14.1
|-
| style="text-align:left;"| 2010–11
| 15 || 12 || 26.5 || .478 || .398 || .868 || 1.5 || 2.8 || .3 || .0 || 14.1 || 12.9
|-
| style="text-align:left;"| 2011–12
| 16 || 13 || 25.6 || .402 || .297 || .880 || 1.3 || 3.2 || 1.0 || .0 || 13.6 || 12.9
|-
| style="text-align:left;"| 2012–13
| 26 || 21 || 25.2 || .448 || .445 || .852 || 1.7 || 2.2 || .3 || .0 || 13.2 || 12.0
|-
| style="text-align:left;"| 2013–14
| 26 || 21 || 24.0 || .404 || .346 || .868 || 1.7 || 3.1 || .5 || .0 || 11.3 || 11.4
|-
| style="text-align:left;"| 2014–15
| 17 || 14 || 22.1 || .370 || .356 || .865 || 1.6 || 3.1 || .2 || .0 || 10.5 || 10.8
|-
| style="text-align:left;"| 2015–16
| 26 || 21 || 22.1 || .373 || .325 || .900 || .9 || 2.2 || .5 || .0 || 9.0 || 7.2
|-
| style="text-align:left;"| 2016–17
| 16 || 8 || 15.3 || .368 || .286 || .938 || 1.1 || 1.8 || .4 || .0 || 5.7 || 3.4
|-
| style="text-align:left;"| 2017–18
| 22 || 7 || 15.5 || .360 || .333 || .889 || 1.1 || 1.9 || .3 || .0 || 6.9 || 5.6
|- class="sortbottom"
| style="text-align:left;"| Career
| style="text-align:left;"|
| 341 || 225 || 25.0 || .426 || .373 || .861 || 1.6 || 2.4 || .7 || .0 || 12.2 || 11.4

NBA

Regular season

|-
| style="text-align:left;"| 2007–08
| style="text-align:left;"| Memphis
| 82 || 30 || 25.8 || .402 || .361 || .849 || 2.6 || 2.2 || .6 || .0 || 10.9
|- class="sortbottom"
| style="text-align:center;" colspan="2"| Career
| 82 || 30 || 25.8 || .402 || .361 || .849 || 2.6 || 2.2 || .6 || .0 || 10.9

Awards and accomplishments

Club honours
EuroLeague: 2002–03, 2009–10
Spanish League: 1998–99, 2000–01, 2002–03, 2003–04, 2008–09, 2010–11, 2011–12, 2013–14
FIBA Korać Cup: 1998–99
Spanish King's Cup: 2001, 2003, 2007, 2010, 2011, 2013, 2018
Spanish Supercup: 2004, 2009, 2010, 2011, 2015
Catalan Tournament: 2000, 2001, 2004, 2009, 2010, 2011, 2012, 2013, 2014, 2015, 2016, 2017

Spanish junior national team
1998 FIBA Europe Under-18 Championship: 
1999 FIBA Under-19 World Cup:

Spanish senior national team
 EuroBasket 2001: 
 EuroBasket 2003: 
 2006 FIBA World Championship: 
 EuroBasket 2007: 
 2008 Summer Olympics: 
 EuroBasket 2009: 
 EuroBasket 2011: 
 2012 Summer Olympics: 
 2016 Summer Olympics: 
 EuroBasket 2017:

Individual awards

Clubs

 Catalan Tournament Final MVP: 2000, 2001
 All-Spanish League Team: 2006, 2007, 2009, 2010
 Spanish League MVP: 2006
 Eurobasket.com's All-EuroLeague Guard of the Year: (2006)
 EuroLeague Top Scorer: 2007
 Spanish League Top Scorer: 2007
 NBA All-Rookie Second Team: 2008
 EuroLeague MVP: 2009
 Spanish League Finals MVP: 2009, 2011, 2014
 Spanish Supercup MVP: 2009, 2010, 2011
 All-Europe Player of the Year: 2009, 2010, 2011
Mr. Europa: 2010
 EuroLeague 2000–10 All-Decade Team: 2010
 EuroLeague 2010–20 All-Decade Team: 2020
EuroLeague Basketball Legend Award: 2014
 EuroLeague Final Four MVP: 2010
 EuroLeague Finals Top Scorer: (2010)
All-EuroLeague Team: 2006, 2007, 2009, 2010, 2011, 2012, 2013
 All-EuroLeague First Team: 2006, 2007, 2009, 2010, 2011
 All-EuroLeague Second Team: 2012, 2013
 Eurobasket.com's Liga ACB Domestic Player of the Year: (2010, 2012)
 EuroLeague all-time leader in field goals made
 EuroLeague all-time leader in three-pointers made
 Number 11 jersey retired by FC Barcelona: (2019)

Spanish national team
 EuroBasket All-Tournament Team: 2005, 2011
 EuroBasket MVP: 2011

See also
 Basketball in Spain
 List of athletes with the most appearances at Olympic Games

References

External links

Juan Carlos Navarro at acb.com 
Juan Carlos Navarro at eurobasket.com
Juan Carlos Navarro at euroleague.net

Juan Carlos Navarro at fibaeurope.com
Juan Carlos Navarro  at nba.com

1980 births
Living people
2002 FIBA World Championship players
2006 FIBA World Championship players
2010 FIBA World Championship players
2014 FIBA Basketball World Cup players
Basketball executives
Basketball players at the 2000 Summer Olympics
Basketball players at the 2004 Summer Olympics
Basketball players at the 2008 Summer Olympics
Basketball players at the 2012 Summer Olympics
Basketball players at the 2016 Summer Olympics
Basketball players from Catalonia
FC Barcelona Bàsquet players
FIBA EuroBasket-winning players
FIBA World Championship-winning players
Liga ACB players
Medalists at the 2008 Summer Olympics
Medalists at the 2012 Summer Olympics
Medalists at the 2016 Summer Olympics
Memphis Grizzlies players
National Basketball Association players from Spain
Olympic bronze medalists for Spain
Olympic basketball players of Spain
Olympic medalists in basketball
Olympic silver medalists for Spain
People from Sant Feliu de Llobregat
Sportspeople from the Province of Barcelona
Point guards
Shooting guards
Spanish expatriate basketball people in the United States
Spanish men's basketball players
Washington Wizards draft picks